There is a significant Colombian diaspora in Mexico. According to the 2020 census, there were 198,500 Colombian citizens residing in Mexico, making them the second largest South American immigrant community in Mexico.

Migration history
After Mexico's independence from Spain, the presence of Colombian people in Mexico was almost nonexistent, although over the years there was an increase of some Colombian immigrants for various reasons in Mexican territory. In the 1895 Census, sixty-seven Colombia-born individuals were counted as residents. It was not until the 1970s when the presence of Colombians increased under the protection of political asylum as refugees by the Mexican government because of the Colombian guerrilla problems fleeing from their country during the 80s and many of them were protected and kept anonymous to avoid persecution. Both countries share the Spanish language; their historical origins are common (part of the Spanish Empire).

Notable individuals

 Gabriel García Marquez, writer
 Álvaro Mutis, writer
 Fernando Botero Zea, politician
 Jorge Ortiz de Pinedo, actor
 Diana Golden, actress
 Harry Geithner, actor
 Aura Cristina Geithner, actress
 Miguel Calero, footballer
 Rómulo Rozo, artist
 Fernando Vallejo, writer
 Daniel Arenas, actor and model
 Sofía Álvarez, actress and singer
 Margarita la Diosa de la Cumbia, singer
 Maria Elisa Camargo, actress
 Juan Pablo Gamboa, actor

See also
Colombia–Mexico relations
Mercado de Medellín

References

External links
 Colombia se hace notar en México from Excélsior

 
Ethnic groups in Mexico
Mexico
Immigration to Mexico